Mount Kapalatmada is a mountain in the Maluku Islands, Indonesia.

See also
 List of Ultras of Malay Archipelago
 List of islands by highest point

References

External links
 "Kapalatmada, Indonesia" on Peakbagger
 "Mount Kapalatmada" on Gunungbagging

Kapalatmada
Buru